Yauca del Rosario District is one of fourteen districts of the province Ica in Peru.

References

1855 establishments in Peru